Scriptol is an object-oriented programming language that allows users to declare an XML document as a class. The language is universal and allows users to create dynamic web pages, as well as create scripts and binary applications.

References

External links 

 

Programming languages
XML-based programming languages
Object-oriented programming languages